Reunion at Fairborough is a 1985 American romantic drama television film directed by Herbert Wise, written by Albert Ruben, and starring Robert Mitchum and Deborah Kerr. It premiered on HBO on May 12, 1985.

Plot
After 40 years, a disillusioned American World War II veteran returns to England for a U.S. Army Air Forces reunion, where he is reunited with his ex-lover, and learns he is a father and a grandfather.

Cast
Robert Mitchum as Carl Hostrup
Deborah Kerr as Sally Wells Grant
Red Buttons as Jiggs Quealy
Judi Trott as Sheila
Barry Morse as Nathan Barsky
Shane Rimmer as Joe Szyluk
Don Fellows as Duffy
Manning Redwood as Col. Brigard
Ed Devereaux as George Klass
Helen Horton as Mrs Bigard

Reception
David Parkinson of Radio Times awarded the film three stars out of five.

References

External links
 
 

1985 television films
1985 films
1985 romantic drama films
1980s American films
1980s English-language films
American drama television films
American romantic drama films
Films about the United States Army Air Forces
Films about veterans
Films directed by Herbert Wise
Films set in England
Films shot in London
Films shot in Surrey
HBO Films films
Romance television films